West Cairn Hill  is a hill in the Pentland Hills range of Scotland.

The border between the council areas of the Scottish Borders and West Lothian runs over the knoll. The closest settlement is the hamlet of Carlops around six kilometers to the southeast. West Calder is nine kilometers to the northwest and Penicuik is eleven kilometers to the east. The Cauldstane Slap pass runs at the saddle point between West and East Cairn Hill. The surrounding hills include Colzium Hill and Torweaving Hill in the southwest, East Cairn Hill in the northeast, and Wether Law in the east.

Surroundings
The Cauldstane Slap, a formerly important pass route, runs between East and West Cairn Hill.

There is a cairn on the top of the West Cairn Hills. Border walls run through the cairn.

Upstream of the northwest flank is the Harperrig Reservoir. Established in 1860, the reservoir dams the water of the Water of Leith and serves both to supply Edinburgh with water and to regulate the flow of the Water of Leith.

References

Mountains and hills of the Scottish Borders
Mountains and hills of West Lothian